Andrea Schenetti (born 9 March 1991) is an Italian professional footballer who plays as a forward for  club Foggia.

Club career

Early career 
Born in Milan, Schenetti started playing football with amateur football academy Olmi, before joining A.C. Milan in 2001. He spent nine seasons in the club's youth system and was a member of both the under-19 squad who won the Campionato Berretti in 2009, and the under-20 side who triumphed in the Coppa Italia Primavera in 2010, 25 years after the team's last success in the competition.

Lucchese and Prato 
At the beginning of the 2010–11 season, Schenetti was loaned out to Prima Divisione club Lucchese. Nevertheless, in the last week of August he suffered a calf injury, which prevented him to play for 45 days. The 19-year-old striker eventually made his official debut for the club on 17 November 2010, in a group stage game of the Coppa Italia Lega Pro against Carpi; he played 70 minutes and also scored the opener, before the opponents fought back in the second half to earn a 2–1 win. On 5 December, Schenetti made his league debut, coming on in the 75th minute of a 0–0 draw against Juve Stabia. That game, however, marked his last appearance for the club, as his loan spell was terminated on 26 January 2011, due to lack of playing time.

Subsequently, Schenetti was sent out on another loan deal to Seconda Divisione club Prato for the remainder of the season. He made 10 league appearances and scored one goal, as the team finished third in the table and qualified for the promotion play-offs, where he made four further appearances and scored two more goals. However, they lost the final 2–1 on aggregate to Carrarese.

Südtirol 
For the 2011–12 season, Schenetti joined Prima Divisione side Südtirol on another loan deal.

Sorrento 
On 31 August 2012, Schenetti moved to Prima Divisione club Sorrento for an undisclosed fee, signing a two-year deal.

Entella
On 9 August 2019, he joined Entella.

Foggia
On 2 August 2022, Schenetti signed a two-year contract with Foggia.

Style of play 
Due to his fast pace, Schenetti usually plays as a winger in a 4–3–3 formation, but he has also been employed as a striker, alongside a more physical forward.

References

External links 
 Profile at aic.football.it 
 

1991 births
Living people
Footballers from Milan
Italian footballers
Association football forwards
Serie A players
Serie B players
Serie C players
Lega Pro Seconda Divisione players
A.C. Milan players
S.S.D. Lucchese 1905 players
A.C. Prato players
F.C. Südtirol players
A.S.D. Sorrento players
Como 1907 players
A.S. Cittadella players
Virtus Entella players
Calcio Foggia 1920 players